William Rushton may refer to:

 W. A. H. Rushton (1901–1980), British physiologist
 Willie Rushton (1937–1996), British comedian